Thomas Speer (born August 20, 1984) is a retired American mixed martial artist. A professional competitor from 2005 until 2013, he received national exposure on The Ultimate Fighter 6: Team Hughes vs. Team Serra, fighting as a member of Team Hughes and his subsequent stint in the UFC. Speer also competed in the WEC and Cage Warriors..

Background
Born and raised on a crop and dairy farm in Elgin, Minnesota, Speer was a star athlete at Elgin Millville High School, where he was an All-State cornerback in football, received four varsity letters in basketball, and reached the state tournament in wrestling during his senior year. After graduating in 2003, Speer continued to develop his wrestling skills and also began competing in mixed martial arts in the local circuit. On May 29, 2015 Speer married Katie Kirckof.

Mixed martial arts career

The Ultimate Fighter
While on The Ultimate Fighter, Speer defeated Jon Koppenhaver and Ben Saunders, both by unanimous decision. In his semifinal bout, he defeated George Sotiropoulos by KO in the first round, advancing him into the finals on December 8, 2007, to face fellow Team Hughes member Mac Danzig. Speer fought Danzig at The Ultimate Fighter: Team Hughes vs Team Serra Finale, and lost via rear-naked choke at 2:01 of the first round.

On April 2, 2008 at UFC Fight Night 13, Speer lost to Anthony Johnson by KO in the first round. Speer was then released by the UFC after this loss.

Independent Promotions
Speer announced his retirement from professional fighting after suffering a loss to Beau Baker in the Cagefest Xtreme 6 show in Norfolk, Virginia. Speer was a late replacement for an injured Shonie Carter.

Speer has since returned to fighting professionally, defeating Jay Ellis by TKO in the first round at the Extreme Challenge 127 on May 30, 2009.

Speer fought Ryan Ford at TFC 10. He lost the fight in the first round via rear-naked choke submission.

Speer faced Mats Nilsson on February 11, 2012 at Cage Warriors Fight Night 3, in which he lost via arm triangle submission.

On April 5, 2013, Speer defeated Strikeforce Vet Lumumba Sayers at MFW: 2 via rear-naked choke submission in round one.

Mixed martial arts record

|-
|Win
|align=center| 21–7
| Lumumba Sayers
|Submission (rear-naked choke)
|MFW: Made For War 2
|
|align=center|1
|align=center|3:39
|Castle Rock, Colorado, United States
|Middleweight bout.
|-
|Loss
|align=center| 20–7
| Jeremy Kimball
|TKO (punches)
|MFW: Made For War 1
|
|align=center|2
|align=center|2:29
|Castle Rock, Colorado, United States
|Middleweight bout.
|-
|Win
|align=center| 20–6
| Kevin Burns
|Decision (split)
|Brutaal: Fight Night
|
|align=center|3
|align=center|5:00
|Tama, Iowa, United States
|
|-
|Loss
|align=center| 19–6
| Mats Nilsson
|Submission (arm-triangle choke)
|Cage Warriors Fight Night 3
|
|align=center|2
|align=center|4:17
|Beirut, Lebanon
|
|-
|Win
|align=center| 19–5
| Indalecio Tat Romero
|Decision (unanimous)
|Extreme Challenge 188: Larson vs. Davila
|
|align=center|3
|align=center|5:00
|Minneapolis, Minnesota, United States
|
|-
|Win
|align=center| 18–5
| Ryan Williams
|Submission (triangle choke)
|Extreme Challenge 170
|
|align=center|3
|align=center|2:48
|Minneapolis, Minnesota, United States
|
|-
|Win
|align=center| 17–5
| Ashkan Morvari 
|Decision (unanimous)
|RG: Rochester Gladiators
|
|align=center|3
|align=center|5:00
|Rochester, Minnesota, United States
|
|-
|Win
|align=center| 16–5
| Jeremy Lafferty 
|TKO (submission to punches)
|RG: Rochester Gladiators
|
|align=center|1
|align=center|2:02
|Rochester, Minnesota, United States
|
|-
|Loss
|align=center| 15–5
| Ryan Ford
|Submission (rear-naked choke)
|TFC 10: High Voltage
|
|align=center|1
|align=center|4:29
|Edmonton, Alberta, Canada
|
|-
|Win
|align=center| 15–4
| Travis Perzynski
|Decision (unanimous) 
|FN: Fight Nation 
|
|align=center|3
|align=center|5:00
|Rochester, Minnesota, United States
|
|-
|Win
|align=center| 14–4
| Jay Ellis
|TKO (punches)
|Extreme Challenge 128
|
|align=center|1
|align=center|2:53
|Rochester, Minnesota, United States
|
|-
|Loss
|align=center| 13–4
| Beau Baker
|Decision (unanimous)
|Cagefest Xtreme Evolution
|
|align=center|3
|align=center|5:00
|Norfolk, Virginia, United States
|
|-
|Win
|align=center| 13–3
| Geno Roderick
|Submission (rear-naked choke)
|CCCW: Capital City Cage Wars
|
|align=center|1
|align=center|3:25
|Springfield, Illinois, United States
|
|-
|Win
|align=center| 12–3
| Joe Julianelle
|TKO (punches)
|10–4: Thunder
|
|align=center|1
|align=center|0:50
|Rochester, Minnesota, United States
|
|-
|Loss
|align=center| 11–3
| Anthony Johnson
|KO (punches)
|UFC Fight Night 13
|
|align=center|1
|align=center|0:51
|Broomfield, Colorado, United States
|
|-
|Loss
|align=center| 11–2
| Mac Danzig
|Submission (rear-naked choke)
|The Ultimate Fighter: Team Hughes vs. Team Serra Finale
|
|align=center|1
|align=center|2:01
|Las Vegas, Nevada, United States
|
|-
|Win
|align=center| 11–1
| Sidney Silva
|KO (punch)
|WEC 27
|
|align=center|1
|align=center|4:33
|Las Vegas, Nevada, United States
|
|-
|Win
|align=center| 10–1
| Robert Farley
|TKO (punches)
|Extreme Challenge 76
|
|align=center|1
|align=center|2:23
|Sloan, Iowa, United States
|
|-
|Win
|align=center| 9–1
| Andy Normington
|TKO (submission to punches)
|Ultimate Combat Sports 19: Battle at the Barn
|
|align=center|1
|align=center|N/A
|Rochester, Minnesota, United States
|
|-
|Win
|align=center| 8–1
| Dan Washburn
|TKO (submission to punches)
|Ultimate Combat Sports 18: Battle at the Barn
|
|align=center|1
|align=center|N/A
|Rochester, Minnesota, United States
|
|-
|Win
|align=center| 7–1
| Sean Huffman
|TKO (corner stoppage)
|Extreme Challenge 72
|
|align=center|1
|align=center|5:00
|Minnesota, United States
|
|-
|Loss
|align=center| 6–1
| John Meyer
|TKO (punches)
|Extreme Challenge 70
|
|align=center|3
|align=center|N/A
|Hayward, Wisconsin, United States
|
|-
|Win
|align=center| 6–0
| Jim Abrille
|TKO (corner stoppage)
|Full Throttle 7
|
|align=center|1
|align=center|5:00
|Georgia, United States
|
|-
|Win
|align=center| 5–0
| Rob Marcks
|TKO (corner stoppage)
|Coliseum: Coliseum 2
|
|align=center|1
|align=center|N/A
|Rochester, Minnesota, United States
|
|-
|Win
|align=center| 4–0
| Gerald Pearson
|TKO (slam)
|ICE 18: International Combat Events 18	
|
|align=center|2
|align=center|N/A
|Fairfield, Ohio, United States
|
|-
|Win
|align=center| 3–0
| Adam Hill
|TKO (punches)
|Ultimate Combat Sports 10: Battle at the Barn
|
|align=center|2
|align=center|N/A
|Rochester, Minnesota, United States
|
|-
|Win
|align=center| 2–0
| Mike van Meer
|Decision (unanimous)
|Ultimate Combat Sports: Throwdown at the T-Bar
|
|align=center|3
|align=center|5:00
|Ellsworth, Minnesota, United States
|
|-
|Win
|align=center| 1–0
| Jose Frausto
|Submission (arm-triangle choke)
|Ultimate Combat Sports 9: Battle at the Barn
|
|align=center|1
|align=center|N/A
|Rochester, Minnesota, United States
|

References

External links

Tommy Speer's The Ultimate Fighter bio

1984 births
Living people
American male mixed martial artists
American male sport wrestlers
Amateur wrestlers
American practitioners of Brazilian jiu-jitsu
Middleweight mixed martial artists
Welterweight mixed martial artists
Mixed martial artists utilizing wrestling
Mixed martial artists utilizing Brazilian jiu-jitsu
Mixed martial artists from Minnesota
People from Wabasha County, Minnesota
Ultimate Fighting Championship male fighters